Gonatodes riveroi is a species of lizard in the family Sphaerodactylidae. The species is endemic to Colombia.

Etymology
The specific name, riveroi, is in honor of Venezuelan herpetologist Carlos Rivero-Blanco.

Geographic range
G. riveroi is found in central Colombia in Boyacá Department, Cundinamarca Department, and Meta Department.

Habitat

Description
G. riveroi is moderately large for its genus.

Behavior
G. riveroi is diurnal.

References

Further reading
Sturaro MJ, Ávila-Pires TCS (2011). "Taxonomic revision of the geckos of the Gonatodes concinnatus complex (Squamata: Sphaerodactylidae), with description of two new species". Zootaxa 2869: 1–36. (Gonatodes riveroi, new species, pp. 26–28). (in English, with an abstract in Portuguese).

Gonatodes
Reptiles described in 2011